Odorgonno Senior High School (Great OSSA) is a Ghanaian based senior secondary school. Its motto is Nobis Nitendum est, which is Latin and means Ours is to Strive. As of 2017, it has 2,671 students and 183 staff, including 53 non-teaching staff.

History
The school was established as a boys' day school in 1940 on the crest of the Odaw River at Adabraka in the Greater Accra Region by Joseph Thomas Leigh and three other teachers at the Accra High School. It was taken into the government system and moved to Awoshie, which is its current location, in 1990. In 1993, it became co-educational, began boarding in 2007, and gained model school status on 25 November 2008.

Notable alumni
Dr Lawrence Tetteh, Renowned Evangelist and Founder of Worldwide Miracle Outreach 
 George Aggudey, Politician
 Richie Agyemfra-Kumi, Politician 
 K.G. Osei Bonsu, lawyer and politician
 Fameye, Musician
 Chris Tsui Hesse, cinematographer, filmmaker, film administrator and photographer
 Clement Kofi Amoah, Filmmaker, film director and producer 
 Bill Okyere Marshall, Playwright 
 Medikal, Musician
 Walter Samuel Nkanu Onnoghen, Chief Justice of Nigeria
 Bob Pixel, Photographer 
 Sheikh I. C. Quaye, Politician 
 Fredrick Percival Segbefia, Politician 
 Mohammed Adjei Sowah, Mayor of Accra.
 Comedian Waris, Ghanaian comedian
 Guy Warren, Musician, best known as the inventor of Afro-jazz
 Incredible Zigi, Dancer

External links
 Odorgonno Senior High School

References

Schools in Ghana
Greater Accra Region
Educational institutions established in 1940
1940 establishments in Gold Coast (British colony)